Scottish singer-songwriter Jimmy Somerville entered the music industry as the lead vocalist of the British pop band Bronski Beat. The trio, originally co-founded along with Steve Bronski and Larry Steinbachek, scored an international success with their debut single entitled "Smalltown Boy". In 1986, Somerville also co-founded The Communards before launching his solo career in 1989.

According to the Syndicat National de l'Édition Phonographique, Somerville himself sold 1,422,905 albums and singles in France as of 2009. While additional 1,765,500 units in common with the Communards.

Albums

Studio albums

Remix albums

Live albums

Compilation albums

Extended plays

Singles

As lead artist

As featured artist

Additional charts
I  The original release of the "Smalltown Boy" single peaked at number 4 on the US component Hot Dance Singles Sales.
J  "Why?" peaked at number 20 on the US Hot Dance Singles Sales.
K  "I Feel Love (Medley)" peaked at number 50 on the US Hot Dance Singles Sales.
L  "Suspicious Minds" peaked at number 49 on the US Hot Dance Singles Sales chart.
M  "Disenchanted" peaked at number 43 on the US Hot Dance Singles Sales chart.
N  "Don't Leave Me This Way" peaked at number 3 on the US Hot Dance Singles Sales chart
O  "Never Can Say Goodbye" peaked at number 3 on the US Hot Dance Singles Sales chart.

Promotional singles

Other appearances

Videos

Video albums

Music videos

Notes
Z  "Dancing Queen" was taken from the Friday Night Live show performed with The Communards.
Z2  "From This Moment On" was also issued on VHS Red Hot + Blue by various artists, released on DVD in 2006.

See also
 Bronski Beat discography
 The Communards discography
 List of UK Singles Chart number ones of the 1980s
 List of best-selling singles of the 1980s in the United Kingdom
 List of number-one dance hits (United States)

References

General

Specific

External links
JimmySomerville.com > Music > Discography

Discography
Discographies of British artists
Pop music discographies